Global Feminisms was a feminist art exhibition that originally premiered at the Elizabeth A. Sackler Center for Feminist Art at the Brooklyn Museum, New York City, United States, in March 2007. The exhibition was co-curated by Maura Reilly and Linda Nochlin and consists of work by 88 women artists from 62 countries. Global Feminisms showcased art across many mediums, all trying to answer the question "what is feminist art?". The show was visually anchored by the installation of Judy Chicago's Dinner Party.

About 
Global Feminisms was the first international exhibition exclusively dedicated to feminist art, from 1990 to 2007. The exhibition was co-curated by Maura Reilly and Linda Nochlin and consists of work by 88 women artists from 62 countries. Global Feminisms showcased work in all media forms, including painting, sculpture, photography, film, video, installation, and performance, with a focus on contemporary feminist art from a global perspective. Conceived as a counterpoint to the landmark 1976 exhibition Women Artists: 1550-1950, the curators aimed to move beyond a Western exclusionary feminism, which has dominated understandings of feminism and feminist art since the 1970s, towards one that is less-defined by a western center and "other" peripheries.

The exhibition included a catalogue with essays by Maura Reilly, Linda Nochlin, N'Goné Fall, Geeta Kapur, Michiko Kasahara, Virginia Pérez-Ratton, Élisabeth Lebovici, Joan Kee, and Charlotta Kotik.

Themes
The Global Feminisms exhibition was arranged by theme, whereas the exhibition catalog was organized geographically. The question that surrounded the exhibition is 'what is feminist art?'. There are a number of definitions of feminist art, therefore, there are several themes throughout the exhibition. The exhibition was displayed in a space that is anchored by the permanent installation of Judy Chicago's Dinner Party, as installed by Maura Reilly. Themes within the exhibition included openness, multiculturalism, variety, and gender inequality. Global Feminisms explored feminist issues among women across and within different cultures, races, classes, religions, and sexualities. Themes within these larger overarching thematic patterns included death, pain, old age, war, sex, and motherhood. The installation at the Brooklyn Museum did not follow a linear chronology, but was organized by four categories which the works overlap: life cycles, identities, politics, and emotion. Life cycles consisted of the stages of life from birth to death. Identities investigated the notions of the self, including racial, gender, political, and religious identities. Politics explored the world through women artists who have demonstrated that the political is personal. Emotions presented the conventional idea of women as emotional creatures and victims.

Reviews and critiques
In a written survey conducted after viewing feminist artworks at the Brooklyn Museum, participant responses revealed that participants had a new awareness of feminism. It is said that Global Feminisms jumps back and forth between the success platforms of the marketplace and the institutional stage. It has been critiqued that most of the work within the exhibition is body-oriented and familiar to the point of old-fashioned.

Artists involved
Global Feminisms featured the work of young and mid-career artists, all born after 1960. These include artists included:

 Lida Abdul
 Mequitta Ahujha
 Pilar Albarracín
 Ghada Amer
 Emmanuelle Antille
 Arahmaiani
 Fiona Banner
 Anna Baumgart
 Rebecca Belmore
 Kate Beynon
Cass Bird
Cabello/Carceller (Helena Cabello and Ana Carceller)
Hsia-Fei Chang
Beatrice Cussol
Amy Cutler
Zoulikha Bouabdellah
Elina Brotherus
 Tania Bruguera
 Lee Bul
Ambreen Butt
Mary Coble
 Angela de la Cruz
 Monika Larsen Dennis
Iskra Dimitrova
 Latifa Echakhch
 Tracey Emin
Fiona Foley
 Parastou Forouhar
Maria Friberg
 Regina José Galindo
Anna Gaskell
Margi Geerlinks
 Skowmon Hastanan
 Elżbieta Jabłońska
 Michèle Magema
 Oreet Asherry
 Teresa Margolies
 Chantal Michel
 Mandana Moghaddam
 Ingrid Mwangi
 Nikki S. Lee
 Hiroko Okada
 Catherine Opie
 Tanja Ostojić
 Patricia Piccinini
 Pipilotti Rist
 Tracey Rose
 Boryana Rossa 
 Jenny Saville
 Canan Şenol
 Tejal Shah
 Dayanita Singh
 Ryoko Suzuki
 Lin Tianmiao
 Milica Tomić
 Yin Xiuzhen
 Miwa Yanagi
 Carey Young

Publication

References

2007 in art
2007 establishments in New York City
Art exhibitions in the United States
Brooklyn Museum
Feminist art